The Indy Autonomous Challenge (IAC) is a series of races with full-scale autonomous race cars.

The original race took place on the Indianapolis Motor Speedway (IMS) in October 2021. The challenge itself started in November 2019 and consisted of several rounds and hackathons in which the competing teams needed to demonstrate their ability to race autonomously. Each team competing in the final race on the IMS used the same vehicle hardware provided by the organizers. The goal of the IAC was purely to focus on the development of a full autonomous driving software stack that enabled perception, planning and control on the racetrack. In total, 1.5 Million USD was provided as prizes for the winning teams.

Further races have taken place at Texas Motor Speedway and Las Vegas Motor Speedway.

Overview 
As a successor of the DARPA Grand Challenge, the IAC aimed to provide a challenging environment for the development of autonomous vehicles. University teams were invited to develop software for solving the autonomous driving task, but in the challenging environment of a racetrack. During the competition, teams used simulation environments and cloud computing to test and prove the maturity of their algorithms. The IAC race cars were to drive up to 290 km/h (180 mph), have high lateral and longitudinal accelerations, needed to plan their path in an adversarial environment and needed to drive safely and reliably with low computation times. The IAC was therefore a proving ground for autonomous vehicles. Overall, three main goals were tackled in the IAC:

 Defining and solving edge case scenarios for autonomous vehicles.
 Catalyzing new autonomous driving technologies and innovations.
 Engaging the public in the competition to help ensure acceptance.

The efforts of the IAC were led by Energy System Network, an Indianapolis-based nonprofit.

Indy Autonomous Challenge racecar: Dallara IL-15 IAC 
For the IAC, a special autonomous race car was developed by Clemson University in the Deep Orange Project and was presented at the CES 2021. The race car was based on a Dallara Indy Lights chassis which was enhanced with computation hardware, sensors and controllers to enable full automation on the racetrack. The vehicle was called "Dallara IL-15 IAC racecar". It was rear-wheel drive, powered by an internal combustion engine that produced  and had a 6-speed sequential gearbox. To perceive the environment the vehicle was equipped with six monocameras, four Radars, three LiDARs and an RTK GPS. As a main computation unit, commercial hardware was used that consisted of an Intel Xeon E 2278 GE – 3.30 GHz (CPU), 1x Nvidia Quadro RTX 8000 (GPU) as well as 64GB Ram. The cars were assembled, serviced and maintained by an external company.

The teams were required to purchase the race cars to take part in the final IAC race rounds 4 and 5.

Timeline, rounds and rules 
The IAC focused completely on the development of software for an autonomous race car; no hardware development was involved. The final challenge was to race with this software in the IAC race cars on the Indianapolis Motor Speedway. Along the way to the final race, the teams completed several rounds and hackathons that served as thresholds that competing teams were required to fulfill. The IAC consisted of 5 rounds that validated the competing teams' capabilities in general, and in software, before they were allowed to race head-to-head with the real cars.

Teams and competition results 

Participation in the IAC was for accredited, tax-exempt colleges and university teams only. After registration opened on 5 November 2019, 45 university teams in total registered for the IAC. While 6 teams did not submit a white paper for Round 1, 39 teams started in the challenge. The competition was won by Team TUM Autonomous Motorsports from the Technical University of Munich.

Autonomous Challenge @ CES 

After the Indy Autonomous Challenge at Indianapolis it was decided to have another competition with the autonomous racecars. This competition was planned for January 07 2022 as part of the Consumer Electronics Show (CES) 2022 in Las Vegas. With the help of CES and ESN the goal was to host a head-to-head, high-speed autonomous racecar passing competition on the Las Vegas Motor Speedway. The event itself was limited to CES attendees but was live streamed.

On January 8, 2023 the event was held again also at Las Vegas Motor Speedway during CES. PoliMOVE won the event again over nine other teams from 17 universities representing 6 countries with a car that reached a top speed of around 180 mph (289.682 km/h) during the event.

References 

Technological races
Motorsport in Indianapolis
Sports competitions in Indianapolis
2020s in Indianapolis
Robotics competitions